María Magdalena Rivera Iribarren (born 28 January 1958) is a Chilean political activist, politician and lawyer.

She is part of the International Workers' Movemement (IWM) linked to the Fourth International (of trotskyist filiation).

Biography
When Rivera was 12 in 1970, she worked as an activist for Salvador Allende candidacy. Then, in 1972 she became part of the Revolutionary Students Front (FER).

In 2019, she was a founding member of the «Popular Defender», organisation which has the objective of defending prisoners of the Social Outbrust (2019–20 protests).

During the 2020–21 period, she was proposed as candidate for the Constitutional Convention, which was formalized in early 2021 when was reported that she will run for the 8th District. Thus, media like El Líbero ―rightist online newspaper― branded her as a «ultra» due to her trotskyist filiation and IWM purposes for take «the power for the workers and the people, only one solution to finish the exploitation and capitalism».

References

External links
 María Rivera at La Tercera
 BCN Profile

Living people
1958 births
Chilean activists
People from Santiago
21st-century Chilean politicians
Members of the List of the People
Members of the Chilean Constitutional Convention
20th-century Chilean lawyers
21st-century Chilean lawyers
Chilean women lawyers
South American Trotskyists
Bolivarian University of Chile alumni